Northport is a community in the Canadian province of Nova Scotia, located on the Northumberland Strait in  Cumberland County at the mouth of the Shinimicas River.

Parks
Amherst Shore Provincial Park
Northport Beach Provincial Park

References

 Northport on Destination Nova Scotia

Communities in Cumberland County, Nova Scotia